The Sweater Shop was a Leicestershire, England, based clothing company with many national outlets.

History
The Sweater Shop Ltd was established by Margaret Wood on 20 March 1973 in Barwell, Leicestershire.

The company was sold on 28 April 1995 to a management buyout for £150m.

Closure
In May 1998 the company went into receivership. At the time of closure it had 78 retail outlets. As of 2020, Sweater Shop (no 'The') is a separate company trading under the same brand name.

Structure
It was headquartered in Syston in the Borough of Charnwood. It made its own products in factories in Leicester and Shepshed. It had a factory in Scotland in Cumnock, East Ayrshire that opened in 1992. On 24 November 1992 Diana, Princess of Wales officially opened the Scottish factory.

References

1973 establishments in the United Kingdom
1998 disestablishments in the United Kingdom
Borough of Charnwood
Clothing retailers of the United Kingdom
Companies based in Leicestershire
Clothing companies established in 1973
Companies disestablished in 1998
Cumnock
Defunct retail companies of the United Kingdom